Samuel Smith Beman (March 11, 1822 – May 9, 1882) was an American lawyer and politician.

Bemman was born in Mount Zion, Hancock County, in the U.S. state of Georgia. His father was Nathan S. S. Beman and his half-brother was William Lowndes Yancey. He was admitted to the Alabama and New York bars. Beman served in the New York State Assembly, in 1853, from Washington County, New York, and was a member of the Whig Party. In 1855, Beman moved to Saratoga, Winona County, Minnesota with his wife and family and continued to practice law. Beman served in the Minnesota Senate, as a Republican in 1857 and 1858, then from 1872 to 1874 , and finally from 1881 to his death in 1882. Beman died in St. Charles, Minnesota.

References

1822 births
1882 deaths
People from Hancock County, Georgia
People from Washington County, New York
People from Winona County, Minnesota
Alabama lawyers
Minnesota lawyers
New York (state) lawyers
Members of the New York State  Assembly
Minnesota state senators
Minnesota Republicans
New York (state) Whigs

}